In optics, an aperture is a hole or an opening through which light travels. More specifically, the aperture and focal length of an optical system determine the cone angle of a bundle of rays that come to a focus in the image plane.

An optical system typically has many openings or structures that limit the ray bundles (ray bundles are also known as pencils of light). These structures may be the edge of a lens or mirror, or a ring or other fixture that holds an optical element in place, or may be a special element such as a diaphragm placed in the optical path to limit the light admitted by the system. In general, these structures are called stops, and the aperture stop is the stop that primarily determines the ray cone angle and brightness at the image point.

In some contexts, especially in photography and astronomy, aperture refers to the diameter of the aperture stop rather than the physical stop or the opening itself. For example, in a telescope, the aperture stop is typically the edges of the objective lens or mirror (or of the mount that holds it). One then speaks of a telescope as having, for example, a 100-centimeter aperture. The aperture stop is not necessarily the smallest stop in the system. Magnification and demagnification by lenses and other elements can cause a relatively large stop to be the aperture stop for the system. In astrophotography, the aperture may be given as a linear measure (for example in inches or mm) or as the dimensionless ratio between that measure and the focal length. In other photography, it is usually given as a ratio.

Sometimes stops and diaphragms are called apertures, even when they are not the aperture stop of the system.

The word aperture is also used in other contexts to indicate a system which blocks off light outside a certain region. In astronomy, for example, a photometric aperture around a star usually corresponds to a circular window around the image of a star within which the light intensity is assumed.
The word "aperture" is also used as a small hole, similar to a peek-hole. For example, in military terms, a bunker's aperture means a small peeking hole made artificially or by natural means. A bunker's aperture can be used for preserving the body from enemy fire while achieving a clear line of sight. (Infantry Combat/The Rifle Platoon/John F. Antal p.91)

Application

The aperture stop is an important element in most optical designs. Its most obvious feature is that it limits the amount of light that can reach the image/film plane. This can be either unavoidable, as in a telescope where one wants to collect as much light as possible; or deliberate, to prevent saturation of a detector or overexposure of film. In both cases, the size of the aperture stop is constrained by things other than the amount of light admitted; however:
The size of the stop is one factor that affects depth of field.  Smaller stops (larger f numbers) produce a longer depth of field, allowing objects at a wide range of distances from the viewer to all be in focus at the same time.
The stop limits the effect of optical aberrations. If the stop is too large, the image will be distorted. More sophisticated optical system designs can mitigate the effect of aberrations, allowing a larger stop and therefore greater light collecting ability.
The stop determines whether the image will be vignetted. Larger stops can cause the intensity reaching the film or detector to fall off toward the edges of the picture, especially when, for off-axis points, a different stop becomes the aperture stop by virtue of cutting off more light than did the stop that was the aperture stop on the optic axis.
A larger aperture stop requires larger diameter optics, which are heavier and more expensive.

In addition to an aperture stop, a photographic lens may have one or more field stops, which limit the system's field of view. When the field of view is limited by a field stop in the lens (rather than at the film or sensor) vignetting results; this is only a problem if the resulting field of view is less than was desired.

The biological pupil of the eye is its aperture in optics nomenclature; the iris is the diaphragm that serves as the aperture stop. Refraction in the cornea causes the effective aperture (the entrance pupil in optics parlance) to differ slightly from the physical pupil diameter. The entrance pupil is typically about 4 mm in diameter, although it can range from 2 mm in a brightly lit place to 8 mm in the dark.

In astronomy, the diameter of the aperture stop (called the aperture) is a critical parameter in the design of a telescope. Generally, one would want the aperture to be as large as possible, to collect the maximum amount of light from the distant objects being imaged. The size of the aperture is limited, however, in practice by considerations of cost and weight, as well as prevention of aberrations (as mentioned above).

Apertures are also used in laser energy control, close aperture z-scan technique, diffractions/patterns, and beam cleaning. Laser applications include spatial filters, Q-switching, high intensity x-ray control.

In light microscopy, the word aperture may be used with reference to either the condenser (changes angle of light onto specimen field), field iris (changes area of illumination) or possibly objective lens (forms primary image). See Optical microscope.

In photography
The aperture stop of a photographic lens can be adjusted to control the amount of light reaching the film or image sensor. In combination with variation of shutter speed, the aperture size will regulate the film's or image sensor's degree of exposure to light. Typically, a fast shutter will require a larger aperture to ensure sufficient light exposure, and a slow shutter will require a smaller aperture to avoid excessive exposure.

A device called a diaphragm usually serves as the aperture stop, and controls the aperture. The diaphragm functions much like the iris of the eye – it controls the effective diameter of the lens opening. Reducing the aperture size (increasing the f-number) provides less light to sensor and also increases the depth of field, which describes the extent to which subject matter lying closer than or farther from the actual plane of focus appears to be in focus. In general, the smaller the aperture (the larger the f-number), the greater the distance from the plane of focus the subject matter may be while still appearing in focus.

The lens aperture is usually specified as an f-number, the ratio of focal length to effective aperture diameter. A lens typically has a set of marked "f-stops" that the f-number can be set to. A lower f-number denotes a greater aperture opening which allows more light to reach the film or image sensor.

Aperture priority is a semi-automatic shooting mode used in cameras. It permits the photographer to select an aperture setting and let the camera decide the shutter speed and sometimes also ISO sensitivity for the correct exposure. This is also referred to as Aperture Priority Auto Exposure, A mode, AV mode (aperture-value mode), or semi-auto mode.

Typical ranges of apertures used in photography are about – or –, covering six stops, which may be divided into wide, middle, and narrow of two stops each, roughly (using round numbers) –, –, and – or (for a slower lens) –, –, and –. These are not sharp divisions, and ranges for specific lenses vary.

Maximum and minimum apertures

The specifications for a given lens typically include the maximum and minimum aperture sizes, for example, –. The maximum aperture opening tends to be of most interest and is always included when describing a lens. This value is also known as the lens "speed", as it affects the exposure time.

When comparing "fast" lenses, the image format used must be considered. Lenses designed for a small format such as half frame or APS-C need to project a much smaller image circle than a lens used for large format photography. Thus the optical elements built into the lens can be far smaller and cheaper.

In exceptional circumstances lenses can have even wider apertures with f-numbers smaller than 1.0; see lens speed: fast lenses for a detailed list. Cheaper alternatives have appeared in recent years, such as the Cosina Voigtländer 17.5mm , 25mm  and 42.5mm  manual focus lenses for the Micro Four-Thirds System. For a long time, the f/0.95 fast f-number for full-frame stopped around 50mm or longer focal length. Until 2021, the lens manufacturer Venus Optics (Laowa) announced the Argus 35mm f/0.95 FF. This is currently the fastest lens with a focal length of 35mm and the widest lens for f/0.95.

Stanley Kubrick's film Barry Lyndon has scenes shot by candlelight with a NASA/Zeiss 50mm f/0.7, the fastest lens in film history. Beyond the expense, these lenses have limited application due to the correspondingly shallower depth of field – the scene must either be shallow, shot from a distance, or will be significantly defocused, though this may be the desired effect.

By contrast, the minimum aperture does not depend on the focal length – it is limited by how narrowly the aperture closes, not the lens design – and is instead generally chosen based on practicality: very small apertures have lower sharpness due to diffraction, while the added depth of field is not generally useful, and thus there is generally little benefit in using such apertures. Depth of field is a significant concern in macro photography, however, and there one sees smaller apertures. The pinhole optic for Lensbaby creative lenses has an aperture of just .

Aperture area
The amount of light captured by a lens is proportional to the area of the aperture, equal to:

Where the two equivalent forms are related via the f-number N = f / D, with focal length f and aperture diameter D.

The focal length value is not required when comparing two lenses of the same focal length; a value of 1 can be used instead, and the other factors can be dropped as well, leaving area proportion to the reciprocal square of the f-number N.

If two cameras of different format sizes and focal lengths have the same angle of view, and the same aperture area, they gather the same amount of light from the scene. In that case, the relative focal-plane illuminance, however, would depend only on the f-number N, so it is less in the camera with the larger format, longer focal length, and higher f-number. This assumes both lenses have identical transmissivity.

Aperture control

Though as early as 1933 Torkel Korling had invented and patented for the Graflex large format reflex camera an automatic aperture control, not all early 35mm single lens reflex cameras had the feature. With a small aperture, this darkened the viewfinder, making viewing, focusing, and composition difficult. Korling's design enabled full-aperture viewing for accurate focus, closing to the pre-selected aperture opening when the shutter was fired and simultaneously synchronising the firing of a flash unit.   From 1956 SLR camera manufacturers separately developed automatic aperture control (the Miranda T 'Pressure Automatic Diaphragm', and other solutions on the Exakta Varex IIa and Praktica FX2) allowing viewing at the lens's maximum aperture, stopping the lens down to the working aperture at the moment of exposure, and returning the lens to maximum aperture afterward. The first SLR cameras with internal ("through-the-lens" or "TTL") meters (e.g., the Pentax Spotmatic) required that the lens be stopped down to the working aperture when taking a meter reading. Subsequent models soon incorporated mechanical coupling between the lens and the camera body, indicating the working aperture to the camera for exposure while allowing the lens to be at its maximum aperture for composition and focusing; this feature became known as open-aperture metering.

For some lenses, including a few long telephotos, lenses mounted on bellows, and perspective-control and tilt/shift lenses, the mechanical linkage was impractical, and automatic aperture control was not provided. Many such lenses incorporated a feature known as a "preset" aperture, which allows the lens to be set to working aperture and then quickly switched between working aperture and full aperture without looking at the aperture control. A typical operation might be to establish rough composition, set the working aperture for metering, return to full aperture for a final check of focus and composition, and focusing, and finally, return to working aperture just before exposure. Although slightly easier than stopped-down metering, operation is less convenient than automatic operation. Preset aperture controls have taken several forms; the most common has been the use of essentially two lens aperture rings, with one ring setting the aperture and the other serving as a limit stop when switching to working aperture. Examples of lenses with this type of preset aperture control are the Nikon PC Nikkor 28 mm  and the SMC Pentax Shift 6×7 75 mm . The Nikon PC Micro-Nikkor 85 mm  lens incorporates a mechanical pushbutton that sets working aperture when pressed and restores full aperture when pressed a second time.

Canon EF lenses, introduced in 1987, have electromagnetic diaphragms, eliminating the need for a mechanical linkage between the camera and the lens, and allowing automatic aperture control with the Canon TS-E tilt/shift lenses. Nikon PC-E perspective-control lenses, introduced in 2008, also have electromagnetic diaphragms, a feature extended to their E-type range in 2013.

Optimal aperture
Optimal aperture depends both on optics (the depth of the scene versus diffraction), and on the performance of the lens.

Optically, as a lens is stopped down, the defocus blur at the Depth of Field (DOF) limits decreases but diffraction blur increases. The presence of these two opposing factors implies a point at which the combined blur spot is minimized (Gibson 1975, 64); at that point, the f-number is optimal for image sharpness, for this given depth of field – a wider aperture (lower f-number) causes more defocus, while a narrower aperture (higher f-number) causes more diffraction.

As a matter of performance, lenses often do not perform optimally when fully opened, and thus generally have better sharpness when stopped down some – this is sharpness in the plane of critical focus, setting aside issues of depth of field. Beyond a certain point, there is no further sharpness benefit to stopping down, and the diffraction begins to become significant. There is accordingly a sweet spot, generally in the  –  range, depending on lens, where sharpness is optimal, though some lenses are designed to perform optimally when wide open. How significant this varies between lenses, and opinions differ on how much practical impact this has.

While optimal aperture can be determined mechanically, how much sharpness is required depends on how the image will be used – if the final image is viewed under normal conditions (e.g., an 8″×10″ image viewed at 10″), it may suffice to determine the f-number using criteria for minimum required sharpness, and there may be no practical benefit from further reducing the size of the blur spot. But this may not be true if the final image is viewed under more demanding conditions, e.g., a very large final image viewed at normal distance, or a portion of an image enlarged to normal size (Hansma 1996). Hansma also suggests that the final-image size may not be known when a photograph is taken, and obtaining the maximum practicable sharpness allows the decision to make a large final image to be made at a later time; see also critical sharpness.

Equivalent aperture range

In digital photography, the 35mm-equivalent aperture range is sometimes considered to be more important than the actual f-number. Equivalent aperture is the f-number adjusted to correspond to the f-number of the same size absolute aperture diameter on a lens with a 35mm equivalent focal length. Smaller equivalent f-numbers are expected to lead to higher image quality based on more total light from the subject, as well as lead to reduced depth of field. For example, a Sony Cyber-shot DSC-RX10 uses a 1" sensor, 24–200 mm with maximum aperture constant along the zoom range;   has equivalent aperture range , which is a lower equivalent f-number than some other  cameras with smaller sensors.

In scanning or sampling
The terms scanning aperture and sampling aperture are often used to refer to the opening through which an image is sampled, or scanned, for example in a Drum scanner, an image sensor, or a television pickup apparatus. The sampling aperture can be a literal optical aperture, that is, a small opening in space, or it can be a time-domain aperture for sampling a signal waveform.

For example, film grain is quantified as graininess via a measurement of film density fluctuations as seen through a 0.048 mm sampling aperture.

See also
 Numerical aperture
 Antenna aperture
 Angular resolution
 Diaphragm (optics)
Waterhouse stop
 Bokeh
 Shallow focus
 Deep focus
 Entrance pupil
 Exit pupil
 Lyot stop

References

 Gibson, H. Lou. 1975. Close-Up Photography and Photomacrography. 2nd combined ed. Kodak Publication No. N-16. Rochester, NY: Eastman Kodak Company, Vol II: Photomacrography. 
 Hansma, Paul K. 1996. View Camera Focusing in Practice. Photo Techniques, March/April 1996, 54–57. Available as GIF images on the Large Format page.

External links
 Stops and Apertures

Science of photography
Geometrical optics
Physical optics
Observational astronomy